Double Dragon Three or variation, may refer to:

 , a 1990 arcade game
 Double Dragon III: The Sacred Stones (1991 video game) released on the Famicom-NES Nintendo Entertainment System

See also
 Double Dragon (disambiguation)